Superstars V8 Next Challenge is a car racing video game based on the Italy-based Superstars Series, and is available for Xbox 360, PlayStation 3 and Windows. It is the sequel to Superstars V8 Racing.

External links
Official website (Flash only)

2010 video games
PlayStation 3 games
PlayStation Network games
Racing simulators
Video games developed in Italy
Windows games
Xbox 360 games
Milestone srl games
Deep Silver games
Multiplayer and single-player video games
Black Bean Games games